Zygmunt Zieliński (1 August 1858 – 11 April 1925) was a Polish general. He reached the rank of colonel in the Austro-Hungarian Army.

In 1914, he volunteered for the Polish Legions, where he commanded the 3rd Brigade, Polish Legions from 1915. From 1917 to 1918, he commanded the Polish Auxiliary Corps. After World War I ended, he participated in the Polish-Ukrainian War and the Polish-Soviet War, commanding the Polish 3rd Army. He retired in 1922.

Awards 
 Order of the White Eagle (1921)
 Commander's Cross of the Virtuti Militari
 Silver Cross of the Virtuti Militari
 Cross of Independence
 Cross of Valor (four times)
 Commander's Cross of the Legion of Honour

Bibliography 

 Tadeusz Kryska-Karski, Stanisław Żurakowski: Generałowie Polski Niepodległej, Editions Spotkania, Warszawa 1991, pp. 27.
 Piotr Stawecki, Słownik biograficzny generałów Wojska Polskiego 1918-1939, Warszawa 1994, pp. 367–368.
 Marian Porwit, Spojrzenia poprzez moje życie, Czytelnik, Warszawa 1986, pp. 63, 66.
 Piotr Hapanowicz, Generał Zygmunt Zieliński (1858–1925), "Gazeta Wyborcza" Kraków, 14 February 2005.
 Piotr Hapanowicz, Żywot legionisty. Generał Zygmunt Zieliński, "Kraków", 9/2008, pp. 48–49.

1858 births
1925 deaths
Polish generals
Recipients of the Silver Cross of the Virtuti Militari
Commanders of the Virtuti Militari
Recipients of the Cross of Valour (Poland)
Polish legionnaires (World War I)
Polish Auxiliary Corps personnel
Austro-Hungarian Army officers
Recipients of the Order of the White Eagle (Poland)